Kanpō (literally "Official report") is the official gazette of the Japanese government. Its official publication started in 1886, from National Printing Bureau of the Ministry of Finance.

Japan traditionally relied on the Kōsatsu, a wooden plaque placed at shukuba and other important places to let the public in general know the shogun's nationwide or daimyo's local proclamations. As the people's literacy rate improved and the modern nation emerged under the Meiji government, the Kōsatsu was abolished in 1873 and eventually replaced by the Kanpō, the  Japanese government gazette, now available on the Internet.

See also
Public notice
Kōsatsu

References

External links
Kanpo Internet Kanpo (National Printing Bureau) in Japanese
Government Publications Service Centers of Kanpo Ltd. in Japanese

Government gazettes
Newspapers published in Japan
Mass media in Japan